Prądnik Biały is one of 18 districts of Kraków, located in the northwest part of the city. The name Prądnik Biały comes from a village of same name that is now a part of the district. 

Subdivisions of Prądnik Biały 
Prądnik Czerwony is divided into smaller subdivisions (osiedles). Here's a list of them.
 Azory
 Bronowice Wielkie
 Osiedle Gotyk
 Górka Narodowa
 Górka Narodowa Wschód
 Górka Narodowa Zachód
 Osiedle Krowodrza Górka
 Osiedle Witkowice Nowe
 Prądnik Biały
 Tonie
 Witkowice
 Żabiniec

Population

References

External links
 Official website of Prądnik Biały
 Biuletyn Informacji Publicznej

Districts of Kraków